Diffa Airport  is an airport serving Diffa, a town in Niger.

The runway has an additional  unpaved overrun on the east end.

Airlines and destinations

See also

Transport in Niger
List of airports in Niger

References

External links
OpenStreetMap - Diffa
OurAirports - Diffa
SkyVector - Diffa
FallingRain - Diffa Airport

Airports in Niger